Ban or Van (बन) is one of the family name included in the Sanyasi/Dashnami (सन्यासी/दशनामी) group, which are one of the Hindu religious cultural groups, literally with meaning "the Forest". Gotra of Ban is Kashyap.

References

Indian surnames